Mordru (also known as Mordru the Merciless) is a supervillain appearing in American comic books published by DC Comics. Created by writer Jim Shooter and artist Curt Swan, Mordru first appeared in Adventure Comics #369 (June 1968).

Considered among the most prominent members of the Lords of Chaos, the character is typically depicted as an adversary of several teams and characters, including the Justice Society of America, Amethyst, Princess of Gemworld, Doctor Fate, Justice League Dark and his primary enemies, the Legion of Super-Heroes. A parasitic-like cosmic entity, the character is depicted as being among the most powerful magic users in the DC Universe and a would-be conqueror, often working to increase his already overwhelming power to control all of existence .

Mordru has been adapted in several times in media, such as the television series Legion of Super-Heroes and Justice League Unlimited.

Fictional character biography

Gemworld
The Lord of Chaos Mordru begins his existence by possessing Wrynn, one of the twin sons of Lord Topaz and Lady Turquoise. Wrynn becomes entranced by the study of black magic. When performing a summoning ritual, Wrynn accidentally resurrects a gemstone golem called Flaw, a servant of the Child and one of the Lords of Chaos; Flaw chooses Wrynn to be the Lords' instrument as they attempt to retake Gemworld. The Lords, giving Wrynn tremendous magical power, rename him "Mordru". As time progresses, Mordru takes over Wrynn's mind and body. Wrynn is reduced to a trapped subconscious with Mordru in full control. Mordru kills Donal during a battle with Amethyst, Princess of Gemworld, and is banished from the Twelve Kingdoms of Gemworld. Amethyst, however, unsatisfied with this punishment, locks Mordru inside Gemworld by merging him with the planet itself. During his years inside Gemworld, Mordru develops taphephobia (the fear of being buried alive), which becomes Mordru's "Achilles' heel".

The Gemworld realm is different from Earth's time. Whenever 20 years time pass on the Gemworld, only 13 years will pass on Earth. At the end of the future Gemworld/Mordru saga, the Gemworld planet is displaced into Earths universe. Mordru (a Lord of Chaos immortal from Cilia) exists many eons before the Gemworld "origin" back story (which is a contradiction). Infinite Crisis erases the Gemworld origin and continues Mordru's Post-Crisis timeline battles with Dr. Fate and other super heroes. As an energy being, Mordu needs to possess mortal host to use his powers. Instead of possessing Wrynn, Mordru controls the form of sorcerer Arion, Lord of Atlantis (from Justice Society #42-50, 1999). Even if 20 year old Wrynn existed post-Infinite Crisis, he would only be 4–5 years old in current DC time. Although Chaos Lord Child mentions Wrynn during the Justice Society conflict, the scheme was to set the Gemworld on a foreseen dark "post-crisis future" and have Mordru subservient through a low powered Wrynn. Donal, Wrynn, and Amber are post-Infinite Crisis characters (alternate time line) erased from existence. The 1987 Amethyst 4-issue mini-series was a possible "future story" +13 years after Crisis on Infinite Earths.

Mordru develops taphephobia from imprisonment in the Rock of Eternity, instead of the defunct Gemworld origin.

Pre-Crisis (20th century)
Chronologically (in DC Universe time), his first battle with costumed superheroes occurs during a meeting between Earth-One's Justice League of America and Earth-Two's Justice Society of America. Mordru (who inhabits the Earth-One universe) magically reaches back through time from the 30th century to the 20th, to capture members of the JLA and JSA and bring them to the future so that they can retrieve artifacts that would free the Demons Three and allow him to steal their powers. During the battle, the Justice League and the Justice Society ally with the Legion of Super-Heroes. His plan fails. There is some loss of continuity following Crisis on Infinite Earths, the battle is restored to continuity by the events of Infinite Crisis, where the Justice League and the Justice Society reside on a combined "New Earth".

Post-Crisis (20th and 21st centuries)
After Crisis on Infinite Earths, Mordru is recast as a timeless "Lord of Chaos"; when the Justice Society face him in the present day, Jack Knight (the current Starman) mentions that he knows of Mordru from his visits to the 30th century, and the android Hourman reveals that he attempted to use his time-manipulation to revert Mordru to a less powerful state but found that Mordru's timeline had no beginning or end, suggesting that Mordru was never born nor would he ever die. Mordru attempts to steal the body and power of the newest "Doctor Fate", but is subsequently imprisoned in Fate's amulet. Once he escapes, he overpowers Fate (Hector Hall), steals his collar and amulet and takes on the familiar garb of Doctor Fate. With the aid of Eclipso and Obsidian, Mordru tries to conquer the world, but is defeated by Doctor Fate and the Justice Society. Fate imprisons Mordru within the "Rock of Eternity". There, Mordru is guarded by the wizard Shazam. Spectre is seduced by Jean Loring, hosted by Eclipso, then murders Shazam moments after Mordru escapes.

Mordru's appearance in the Princes of Darkness story arc marks a connection with the backstory of Power Girl and its revision in Infinite Crisis. The defeat of Mordru entails the freeing the soul of Atlantean sorcerer Arion (Mordru was using Arion's body as a host, but freeing Arion's soul required Arion to pass through his body on the way to the afterlife, disrupting Mordru's power long enough for others to stop him), during which Arion states he is not the grandfather of Power Girl.

After his escape from the "Rock of Eternity", Mordru seeks revenge on Fate and the Justice Society. During Mordru's battle with Fate (now manifesting in his helm and cloak on his own without a host), Mordru and Fate encounter different timelines, such as the Kingdom Come timeline. Fate mocks Mordru, suggesting he is a 'cosmic fluke' and a cancer and that no other versions of him exist. Mordru is then defeated by Jakeem Thunder, who places him "somewhere where none of us will see him again".

Mordru returns to again impersonate Fate, but the members of the Justice Society see the ruse. When cast out, Mordru returns to his original form (Volume 2, issue #34).

Pre-Zero Hour (30th Century)
In the 30th century, Mordru becomes one of the most powerful figures in the universe. Although Mordru's story line suffers some loss of continuity, there is an essential plot: 
Mordru appears on Zerox (the Sorcerer's planet). He joins the sorcerers, rises in power and takes control in a coup. In doing so, he steals the sorcerers' powers, but his apprentice, Mysa Nal (the White Witch) escapes.

Mordru, now known as the "Dark Lord", creates an unstoppable, tyrannical space empire by conquering nearby planets. He combines the technology of the conquered planets with his sorcery. For example, he can jam an enemy's weapons before a space battle. However, Brainiac 5 notices that the Dark Lord is choosing his conquests carefully "as if selecting baubles from a jeweller's tray" (Adventure Comics #369) thus suggesting his power has wavered. Earth remains free, defended by "The Legion of Superheroes". In a large space battle, the Legion defeats the Dark Lord's armada. Mordru fights back by appearing as a hundred-foot armored giant. After he defeats the Legion, he reverts to his normal stature to rejoice in his victory, failing to notice that Mon-El and Superboy were not present during the fight. He is then quickly sealed in an airless vault at superspeed by Superboy and Mon-El. This triggers his phobia rendering him comatose. The vault is placed beneath Legion Headquarters.

While exploring the headquarters, Shadow Lass finds Mordru's vault and opens the outer door. While trying to open the main door, she is interrupted by Mon-El, who warns Shadow Lass and shuts the vault. He opens an outer glass window which lets them see safely inside, but they see Mordru is revived and coming thru the vault side. Mon-El sounds the alarm and Superboy tries to reach him but is rendered unconscious by Mordru, who has not yet regained his full strength. The Legion flee through a Time Bubble. The Legion have no time to set the bubble and arrive at its last setting, Smallville in Superboy's time. They hide the bubble and aided by Clark Kent (Superboy) they assume secret identities. Through Lana Lang and the Smallville townsfolk, Mordru finds the Legion. They battle and again, Mordru is left imprisoned and comatose. This establishes the classic Mordru story cycle: Mordru is freed, continues his obsession with destroying the Legion then loses in battle, only to be trapped again until the next time.

Earthwar

Mordru manipulated the Resource Raiders, the Khunds, the Dark Circle and events on Weber's World (a diplomatic conference between the United Planets and the Dominion) in order to take over Earth and defeat the Legion, but is defeated. In the aftermath of the crisis, the Khunds and the Dark Circle are driven out of United Planets territory. The U.P. and the Dominion sign an extended peace treaty.

Lord Romdur
Mordru flees to Avalon (a backwater planet). He takes the name Romdur (an anagram of Mordru). Star Boy uses his "mass-inducing" power to collapse Modru's castle, trapping him again.

Great Darkness Saga

One of Darkseid's Servants of Darkness frees Mordru from imprisonment on Avalon, and Darkseid steals his powers. He is left powerless on Zerox.

Legion of Super-Heroes, volume 4
Mordru is fated to rule the universe for a thousand years. The Time Trapper tries to use the Legion to stop Mordru's rise to power, but in the Great Darkness Saga, the Legion become more powerful than expected. The Time Trapper realizes the Legion is a potential threat. When Mon-El destroys the Time Trapper, it causes a disruption of the space-time continuum and reveals a universe in which Mordru does come to power. Glorith, a minor villain, casts a spell, at the expense of her own life. With this spell, she goes back in time and becomes a time manipulator responsible for creation of the Legion (and modifying the timeline to account for the removal of Superboy and Supergirl from continuity and their replacement with Valor and Andromeda, with Valor being a combination of Mon-El with Superboy's history and influence in the Legion).

In the new timeline, Glorith orchestrates a battle between Mordru and the Legion. Glorith plans to have Mordru and the Legion destroy each other so she can come to power. Ultra Boy discovers her plan. He coerces Mordru to attack Glorith. It is this battle which is said to explain Mordru's wavering planetary conquest (Adventure Comics #369). At this point, the Sorcerers of Zerox find an opportunity to remove Mordru's powers and cure his mind. He finds contentment on Zerox and later, after Zerox was destroyed in the "Magic Wars", on Tharn. He marries Mysa Nal.

Following the Magic Wars, there is galactic economic collapse and Tharn faces destruction by the Khund. To protect the planet against the Khund starships, the Sorcerers' Council restores Mordru's powers (even though they know the power will corrupt Mordru). Mordru defeats the Khunds and becomes Emperor. He is not as powerful as before. He can defeat the Green Lantern, Rond Vidar but not the combined powers of The Legion and the United Planets. Mordru joins with Glorith and together they make a number of attempts to secure power. One such attempt disturbs the internal logic of the Zero Hour crossover story.

Relations with other Villains (Pre-Zero Hour)
Due to Mordru's power, other would-be conquerors of the 30th century consider Mordru (and hence the Legion) in their plans. For example, Pulsar Stargrave masquerades as Brainiac 5's father and sends Brainy's real father on a series of missions to gather artifacts that could defeat Mordru. Stargrave enlists the aid of the Time Trapper, a "time manipulator". Stargrave orders the Time Trapper to prove his worth by killing the Legion. When the Time Trapper fails, Stargrave tries to enlist the Legion themselves. Later on, an alien sorcerer named Sden tries to trick the Legion into retrieving yet another artifact, again with the goal of defeating Mordru.

Post-Zero Hour (30th and 31st centuries)
After Zero Hour, the future of the DC Universe was completely rebooted. Instead of an established Legion, a new Legion with younger heroes had just been formed, and the history between the 21st and 30th centuries had changed. The story after Zero Hour has Mordru establishing a large empire in the 28th and 29th centuries before being imprisoned by Mysa (now his daughter rather than his apprentice) in an airtight vault on the Yuen asteroid. In the battle, Mysa's allies are killed and she is severely aged.

Mordru is released by a mining project on the Yuen asteroid controlled by a group of disgruntled Legion rejects. The new Legion consisting of Sensor, Umbra and Magno investigates unusual events on the asteroid. Mordru searches for his lost talismans which hold his power such as the Emerald Eye of Ekron. The owner of the Eye defends the relic until a Legion led alliance (including Mysa (who is now de-aged), the Workforce, and the Amazers) defeats Mordru and imprisons him in an airtight sphere. Although the "Elements of Disaster" threatened at one point to revive him, Mordru remains imprisoned.

Legion of 3 Worlds

In this story that is part of the Final Crisis storyline, Mordru is one of Superboy-Prime's Legion of Super-Villains. Mordru rules the Sorcerers' World and holds the White Witch hostage. After killing Glorith, Dragonmage and Prince Evillo, Mordru holds the remaining magic of the universe. He also receives the power of Kinetix (killed by Superboy-Prime) and that of the other sorcerers of "Universe-247". However, the White Witch absorbs Mordru. Due to Mordru's evil, in doing so she becomes the "Black Witch".

Powers and abilities
In his initial portrayals and depictions, the character's power is described as originating from a mastery of black magic, able to perform virtually any sort of feat of magic, his abilities and powers considered immesurable. In addition to his magical powers, he is functionally immortal; the android Hourman observed that he couldn't see a beginning or end to Mordru's timeline when viewing the villain with his time-vision. In later stories, it is stated that his powers and magical abilities are derived from chaos energies, although he has learnt to include some aspects of order in his powers for suitable balance. His level of power makes him the premier sorcerer in the 30th and 31st centuries in the known universe and the Legion of Super-Hero's most powerful foe, with only Darkseid and Time Trapper (or Glorith) rivalling or surpassing (the former) the wizard.

In modern depictions, the character's power is derived exclusively from a form of magic known as "chaos magic", a form of magic that requires to known systems (pentagrams, spells, etc.) to cast and is exclusive to his fellow Chaos Lords. His mastery of chaos magic makes him claim to be the only "true" Lords of Chaos and is depicted as being far more powerful than other magic users in the DC Universe such as Zatanna and John Constantine (although he is generally matched when in combat with Doctor Fate) as well as being one of the few beings to not fear the magic consuming being, Upside-Down Man.

In other media

Television 
 Mordru appears in Legends of the Superheroes, portrayed by Gabriel Dell. This version is the leader of the Legion of Doom.
 Mordru makes a non-speaking appearance in the Justice League Unlimited episode "The Greatest Story Never Told".
 Mordru appears in the Legion of Super Heroes episode "Trials", voiced by Jim Ward.

Video games 
Mordru appears in DC Universe Online.

References

External links
 Mordru at DC Comics Wiki

DC Comics supervillains
DC Comics characters who use magic
DC Comics characters with superhuman strength
DC Comics characters who can teleport
DC Comics characters with accelerated healing
DC Comics characters who have mental powers
DC Comics telekinetics 
DC Comics telepaths
Comics characters introduced in 1968
Characters created by Jim Shooter
Characters created by Curt Swan
Fictional characters with immortality
Fictional characters with elemental transmutation abilities
Fictional characters with evocation or summoning abilities
Fictional characters with healing abilities
Fictional characters with spirit possession or body swapping abilities
Fictional characters with superhuman senses